Multi-headed can refer to: 

 Polycephaly, the condition of having more than one head
 Lernaean Hydra, an ancient serpent-like chthonic water beast that possessed numerous heads
 Multi-headed train, where two or more engines are used
 Multi-monitor, multiple physical display devices running on a single computer system